is a Japanese-American professional basketball player for Kyoto Hannaryz of the B.League. He played college basketball for the Seattle Redhawks, UC Santa Barbara Gauchos and the UBC Thunderbirds.

High school career 
Moore attended Bellevue High School in Bellevue, Washington and played for its varsity basketball team. As a senior, he averaged 12.6 points per game, helping the Wolverines finish the season with a 25–4 record. For his performance, he was named to the Second Team All-King County.

Moore also played club basketball for the Emerald City Basketball Academy Pioneers.

College career

Seattle 
Moore attended Seattle University and played for the Redhawks. He made his collegiate debut on December 17, 2015, against the Northwest Indian Eagles, posting season-highs on scoring and rebounds with 17 and seven, respectively, while shooting 63.6 percent from the field and 50.0 percent from three. As a freshman, he averaged 3.1 points, 1.2 rebounds and 0.4 assists over 16 games.

In his first game of the season, Moore scored 15 points and grabbed two rebounds against the Pacific Lutheran Lutes on November 11, 2016. On January 26, 2017, he grabbed a season-high nine rebounds versus the New Mexico State Aggies. Two days later, he posted a season-high 33 points on 11-of-14 shooting from the field and 8-of-10 from three, to go along with six rebounds, two assists, one block and two steals in a 96–84 win over UTRGV Vaqueros, setting a program record for the second most 3-pointers in a single game. As a sophomore, Moore made 16 starts and he averaged 10.4 points, 3.9 rebounds and 0.9 assists in 26.6 minutes per game while shooting 41.6 percent from the field and 37.9 percent from three. He led the Redhawks in 3-pointers made for the season with 74.

UC Santa Barbara 
Moore transferred to University of California, Santa Barbara and sat out the 2017–18 season.

On November 6, 2018, Moore made his debut for the Gauchos in a game against the Wyoming Cowboys, scoring a season-high six points and grabbing one rebound. On November 13, he registered season-highs on rebounds and assists with four and seven, respectively, versus California Lutheran University. Moore finished the season averaging 1.2 points, 0.6 rebounds and 1.1 assists in 6.9 minutes over 11 games.

UBC 
Moore transferred from NCAA to U Sports, where he played for the University of British Columbia. On January 4, 2020, he scored a season-high 14 points against UFV Cascades. On February 21, Moore logged a double-double with 13 points and a season-high 11 rebounds in a playoff win over the Saskatchewan Huskies. He started in 16 of 30 games for the Thunderbirds, averaging 7.4 points, 5.7 rebounds and 1.5 assists for the 2019–20 season.

With the 2020–21 U Sports season being cancelled due to COVID-19 pandemic, Moore did not play a single game for the Thunderbirds.

Professional career

Osaka Evessa (2021–present) 
On June 11, 2021, Moore signed with the Osaka Evessa of the B.League.

Personal life 
Moore, a Japanese-American, was born in Bellevue, Washington. He has one older brother named Jeffrey.

Career statistics

College

U Sports 

|-
| style="text-align:left;"| 2019–20
| style="text-align:left;"| UBC
| 30 || 16 || 23.6 || .384 || .296 || .677 || 5.7 || 1.5 || 1.2 || .4 || 7.4

NCAA Division I 

|-
| style="text-align:left;"| 2015–16
| style="text-align:left;"| Seattle
| 16 || 0 || 8.0 || .457 || .407 || 1.000 || 1.2 || .4 || .1 || .1 || 3.1
|-
| style="text-align:left;"| 2016–17
| style="text-align:left;"| Seattle
| 30 || 16 || 26.6 || .416 || .379 || .875 || 3.9 || .9 || .8 || .2 || 10.4
|-
| style="text-align:left;"| 2017–18
| style="text-align:left;"| UC Santa Barbara
| style="text-align:center;" colspan="11"|  Redshirt
|-
| style="text-align:left;"| 2018–19
| style="text-align:left;"| UC Santa Barbara
| 11 || 0 || 6.9 || .556 || .600 || – || .6 || 1.1 || .3 || .2 || 1.2
|- class="sortbottom"
| style="text-align:center;" colspan="2"| Career
| 57 || 16 || 17.6 || .425 || .388 || .894 || 2.5 || .8 || .5 || .1 || 6.6

References

External links 

 Seattle Redhawks bio
 UC Santa Barbara Gauchos bio
 UBC Thunderbirds bio
 College career statistics from Sports-Reference.com
 

1997 births
Living people
People from Bellevue, Washington
Basketball players from Washington (state)
Japanese men's basketball players
Small forwards
Seattle Redhawks men's basketball players
UC Santa Barbara Gauchos men's basketball players
American expatriate basketball people in Japan
Osaka Evessa players